Sepahua is a district in southern Atalaya Province in Peru. It is bordered by the Junín Region on the west, the district of Raymondi on the north, the Echarate District on the east, and  national land  on the south.

External links
  Municipalidad Distrital de Sepahua
  Sepahua Selva
  

Districts of the Atalaya Province
Districts of the Ucayali Region